The members of the 20th Manitoba Legislature were elected in the Manitoba general election held in July 1936. The legislature sat from February 18, 1937, to March 12, 1941.

The Liberal-Progressive Party led by John Bracken formed a minority government with the support of Social Credit members.

Errick Willis of the Conservatives was Leader of the Opposition.

Robert Hawkins served as speaker for the assembly.

There were five sessions of the 20th Legislature:

William Johnston Tupper was Lieutenant Governor of Manitoba until November 1, 1940, when Roland Fairbairn McWilliams became lieutenant governor.

Members of the Assembly 
The following members were elected to the assembly in 1936:

Notes:

By-elections 
None.

References 

Terms of the Manitoba Legislature
1937 establishments in Manitoba
1941 disestablishments in Manitoba